Groß Naundorf (or Gross Naundorf) is a village and a former municipality in Wittenberg district in Saxony-Anhalt, Germany. Since 1 January 2011, it is part of the town Annaburg. The municipality belonged to the administrative municipality (Verwaltungsgemeinschaft) of Annaburg-Prettin.

Geography
Groß Naundorf lies about 11 kilometres south of Jessen.

Economy and transportation
Federal Highway (Bundesstraße) B 187 running from Wittenberg to Jessen is about 12 km away.

References

External links
Administrative municipality website

Former municipalities in Saxony-Anhalt
Annaburg